Mary Machuche Mwanjelwa (born 27 August 1965) is a Tanzanian politician belonging to the ruling Chama Cha Mapinduzi party and a special seat Member of Parliament since 2010. She was the Deputy Minister of Agriculture, and as the deputy minister of State in the President's Office responsible for Public Service and Good Governance.

Background and education
She was born in the present-day Mbeya Region, on 27 August 1965. She attended Muungano Primary School. She then transferred to Sangu Secondary School for her middle school studies. For her high school education she attended Siha Secondary School. In 2009 she graduated from St. Augustine University of Tanzania, with a Master of Science degree. Later, she was awarded a Doctor of Philosophy degree by the Open University of Tanzania.

Employment history
From 2000 until 2001, she was employed as a Manager at Two Wings Pegasus Tanzania. She then transferred to "Placer Dome Tanzania", a gold mine belonging to Barrick Gold, as a manager, serving in that capacity from 2001 until 2005. From 2006 until 2010, she served as a corporate director at PSI Tanzania.

Political career
According to her profile at the website of the Tanzanian parliament, Mary Machuche Mwanjelwa has been active in the party politics of the Chama Cha Mapinduzi dating back to 2006. She was elected to the Parliament of Tanzania in 2010, serving as a Special Seats member until 2015. During that time-frame she served as a Board Member of the National Institute for Medical Research (NIMR), from 2013 until 2015.

In 2015, she was re-elected to parliament. In 2016, he served in three capacities (a) as the chairperson of the Lands, Natural Resources and Tourism Committee of the Parliament of Tanzania (b) as the Presiding Officer of the Parliament of Tanzania and (c)as a member of the Stearing Committee of the Parliament of Tanzania.

On 9 October 2017, she was sworn in by president John Magufuli, as the Deputy Minister of Agriculture.

See also
Cabinet of Tanzania

References

External links
Tanzania President Magufuli Reshuffles Cabinet, on 7 October 2017
Website of the Parliament of Tanzania

1965 births
Living people
Chama Cha Mapinduzi MPs
Tanzanian MPs 2010–2015
Tanzanian MPs 2015–2020
Open University of Tanzania alumni
St. Augustine University of Tanzania alumni
Deputy government ministers of Tanzania
21st-century Tanzanian women politicians
People from Mbeya Region
Women government ministers of Tanzania
Sangu Secondary School alumni